Magnolia: Music from the Motion Picture is the soundtrack album to the 1999 film Magnolia by Paul Thomas Anderson. Largely composed of songs by Aimee Mann, it also features tracks by Gabrielle, Supertramp and Jon Brion. The album received positive reviews and was certified gold in 2001.

Music
The music of Aimee Mann inspired the director Paul Thomas Anderson to write Magnolia; he said he "sat down to write an adaptation of Aimee Mann songs". The film also features a sequence in which the characters sing along to Mann's song "Wise Up". Mann originally recorded "Wise Up" to be used in the 1996 film Jerry Maguire, but the director, Cameron Crowe, felt the final version did not fit the scene he planned it for. Crowe said: "It was definitely heartbreaking to not be able to use it. Of course, Paul Thomas Anderson was smart enough to give it a bigger home in Magnolia."

Only two of the songs were written for the film: "You Do" and "Save Me". "Save Me" garnered Mann an Academy Award nomination for Best Original Song, losing to Phil Collins's song "You'll Be in My Heart" from Tarzan.

The tracks "Deathly", "Driving Sideways", and "You Do" also appear on Aimee Mann's following album, Bachelor No. 2, though the track "Save Me" replaces "Driving Sideways" on EU editions. "Nothing Is Good Enough", here an instrumental, appears in lyrical form on that album. (Bachelor also includes "Red Vines", a song Mann wrote about director Anderson.)

The song "One", written by Harry Nilsson and originally made popular by Three Dog Night, is played during the first five minutes of the movie, and contains several obscure musical references to other Nilsson songs. It opens with a sample of Nilsson saying "Okay, Mr. Mix!" taken from the start of his song "Cuddly Toy". This version of the song also includes lyrics from Nilsson's song "Together" sung in the background. ("Life isn't easy when two are divided / and one has decided / to bring down the curtain / and one thing's for certain / there's nothing to keep them together."). Furthermore, the opening vocal motif from Nilsson's song "Good Old Desk" is used as a background vocal line (at approximately 1:54 into the song). Neil Innes, from The Bonzo Dog Doo Dah Band and The Rutles, and Chris Difford of Squeeze provide backing vocals. This track originally appeared on the For the Love of Harry: Everybody Sings Nilsson tribute album.

Reception

In a 2020 look back at the release, Alex McLevy of The A.V. Club praised the film for widening Mann's audience and the unique way that the writing of the film coincided with the musician's songwriting.

By February 2001, the soundtrack had sold 410,000 units in the United States.

Track listing
All songs performed by Aimee Mann, except where noted.

Charts and certifications

Charts

Year-end charts

Certifications

References

1999 soundtrack albums
Aimee Mann soundtracks
Albums produced by Brendan O'Brien (record producer)
Albums produced by Jon Brion
1990s film soundtrack albums
Reprise Records soundtracks